The 2005 Ontario Scott Tournament of Hearts, Ontario's provincial women's curling championship, was held January 24–30 at the Rideau Curling Club in Ottawa. The winning team of Jenn Hanna would go on to represent Ontario at the 2005 Scott Tournament of Hearts in St. John's, Newfoundland and Labrador.

Hanna's win would be the first of two provincial championships in her career, not winning her second championship until 2016. It would also be the lone provincial championship for her third Pascale Letendre and the first of two for her sister, lead Stephanie Hanna. Her second Dawn Askin would later move to Manitoba to play lead for Jennifer Jones and win several provincial, national, two world championships and an Olympic gold there.

Hanna's rink from the nearby Ottawa Curling Club had a slow start at the event, and had a 1-4 record at one point. However, they pulled off eight straight wins to win the championship. At the national Scott Tournament of Hearts, the rink had a similar slow start before rallying to make the playoffs before losing in the final to Manitoba's Jones.

The defending champion Sherry Middaugh rink failed to qualify.

Teams

Standings

Round robin scores

Draw 1
January 24
McGhee 6-5 Moore
Cadorin 7-4 Hanna
Schwar 9-5 Uhryn
Scarf 8-6 Brown
Rizzo 8-5 George

Draw 2
January 24
George 9-5 Hanna
Moore 7-4 Schwar
McGhee 6-3 Brown
Cadorin 8-4 Rizzo
Scharf 8-2 Uhryn

Draw 3
January 25
Cadorin 6-3 Uhryn
Brown 7-4 Rizzo
Scharf 6-5 Moore
George 7-1 Schwar
Hanna 7-2 McGhee

Draw 4
January 25
Moore 7-6 Brown
Uhryn 9-6 Hanna
Cadorin 7-3 George
McGhee 6-3 Scharf
Rizzo 5-3 Schwar

Draw 5
January 26
McGhee 6-5 Schwar
Scharf 7-0 George
Cadorin 11-6 Moore
Rizzo 7-3 Hanna
Brown 7-6 Uhryn

Draw 6
January 26
Scharf 9-1 Rizzo
Uhryn 7-6 McGhee
Brown 6-4 Cadorin
Hanna 9-3 Schwar
Moore 6-4 George

Draw 7
January 27
Hanna 6-3 Brown
Rizzo 8-1 Moore
Scharf 6-1 Schwar
George 8-3 Uhryn
McGhee 8-1 Cadorin

Draw 8
January 27
Cadorin 7-6 Schwar
Brown 8-6 George
Uhryn 7-4 Moore
Rizzo 5-4 McGhee
Hanna 9-4 Scharf

Draw 9
January 28
Rizzo 8-1 Uhryn
Cadorin 10-7 Scharf
George 8-7 McGhee
Hanna 9-4 Moore
Brown 9-4 Schwar

Tiebreakers
January 28 & 29
McGhee 8-5 Brown
Hanna 7-4 McGhee

Playoffs

1 vs. 2
January 29

3 vs. 4
January 29

Semifinal
January 30

Final
January 30

Qualification

Southern Ontario Zone winners
Regional winners in bold. Challenge round qualifiers in bold and italics.

* Fill in team from a different zone (not enough entries)

References
Ottawa Citizen, January 25–31 editions
Ottawa Sun, January 30 & 31 editions
Ontario Curling Association - 2005 Annual General Meeting Report

Ontario Scott Tournament of Hearts
Curling in Ottawa
Ontario Scotties Tournament of Hearts
Ontario Scott Tournament of Hearts
2000s in Ottawa
Ontario Scott Tournament of Hearts